This is a list of women writers (including poets) who were born in Italy or whose writings are closely associated with that country.

A
 Vittoria Aganoor (1855–1910), poet, letter writer
 Milena Agus (born 1959), novelist
 Sibilla Aleramo (1876–1960), poet, autobiographer, feminist writer
 Gabriella Ambrosio (born 1954), novelist, essayist, journalist 
 Isabella Andreini (1562–1604), playwright, poet, actress
 Tullia d'Aragona (c. 1510–1556), writer, philosopher, courtesan
 Antonia Arslan (born 1938), novelist, critic, translator, educator
 Devorà Ascarelli (c. 16th century), poet and translator
 Costanza d'Avalos Piccolomini (died 1560), poet
 Elisa S. Amore (born 1984), novelist

B
 Ida Baccini (1850–1911), children's writer
 Emma Baeri (born 1942), feminist historian, political scientist
 Teresa Bandettini (1763–1837), poet, dancer
 Anna Banti (1895–1985), historical novelist, critic, autobiographer
 Barbara Baraldi, thriller novelist  
 Giuseppa Barbapiccola, (1702–c. 1740), poet, translator
 Laura Battiferri (1523–1589), poet 
 Giuliana Berlinguer (1933–2014), film director, screenwriter, novelist
 Angela Bianchini (1921–2018), novelist, short story writer, translator
 Alberta Bigagli (1928–2017), poet
 Margarita Bobba (16th century), poet
 Catherine of Bologna (1413–1463), religious writer, saint
 Simona Bonafé (born 1973), journalist, politician
 Laudomia Bonanni (1907–2002), writer, journalist
 Maria Selvaggia Borghini (1656–1731), poet, translator
 Helle Busacca (1915–1996), poet, painter, author

C
 Paola Calvetti (born 1958), novelist, journalist
 Duccia Camiciotti (1928–2014), poet, essayist
 Manuela Campanelli (born 1962), journalist, non-fiction writer
 Paola Capriolo (born 1962), novelist, translator
 Lara Cardella (born 1969), novelist, author of Good Girls Don't Wear Trousers
 Catherine of Siena (1347–1380), religious writings
 Nadia Cavalera (born 1950), novelist, poet, critic
 Laura Cereta (1469–1499), 15th-century letter writer
 Isabella Cervoni (1575–1600), poet
 Alba de Céspedes (1911–1997), journalist, novelist
 Saveria Chemotti (born 1947), non-fiction, essays, literary criticism, novels
 Maria Chessa Lai (1922–2012), Catalan poet from Sardinia
 Fausta Cialente (1898–1994), novelist 
 Maria Luisa Cicci (1760–1794), poet
 Vittoria Colonna (1492–1547), popular 16th-century poet
 Danila Comastri Montanari (born 1948), novelist 
 Cristina Comencini (born 1956), novelist, film director
 Margherita Costa (17th century), poet, songwriter 
 Maria Corti (1915–2002), philologist, critic, novelist

D
 Virgilia D'Andrea (1888–1933), anarchist poet
 Emanuela Da Ros (born 1959), children's writer
 Grazia Deledda (1871–1936), novelist, poet, Nobel laureate
 Silvana De Mari (born 1953), children's writer, fantasy novelist
 Compiuta Donzella (13th century), earliest women poet writing in Italian
 Paola Drigo (1876–1938), short story writer, novelist
 Francesca Duranti (born 1935), novelist

E
 Muzi Epifani (1935–1984), novelist, poet, playwright, columnist

F
 Camilla Faà (c. 1599–1662), early autobiographer 
 Oriana Fallaci (1929–2006), journalist, biographer 
 Eleonora Fonseca Pimentel (1752–1799), poet, letter writer
 Moderata Fonte (1555–1592), Venetian poet 
 Laudomia Forteguerri (1515–1555?), poet 
Biancamaria Frabotta (born 1946), poet, playwright, essayist, non-fiction writer 
 Veronica Franco (1546–1591), poet

G
 Veronica Gambara (1485–1550), poet, letter writer 
 Brunella Gasperini (1918–1979), journalist, novelist
 Natalia Ginzburg (1916–1991, novelist, short story writer, essayist 
 Cinzia Giorgio (born 1975), novelist, playwright, essayist
 Elisabetta Gnone (born 1965), children's writer
 Simonetta Greggio (born 1961), novelist, writes in French
 Amalia Guglielminetti (1881–1941), poet, letter writer
 Margherita Guidacci (1921–1992), poet, translator
Lucia Guerrini (1921–1990), classical scholar, archaeologist, writer and editor

J
 Fleur Jaeggy (born 1940), Swiss-born Italian-language novelist

M
 Maria-Antonietta Macciocchi (1922–2007), journalist, non-fiction writer 
 Alessandra Macinghi (1406–1471), letter writer
 Clementina Laura Majocchi (1866–1945)
 Maria Majocchi (1864–1917) writer, journalist, editor-in-chief
 Laura Beatrice Mancini (1821–1869), poet, salonist
 Gianna Manzini (1896–1974), novelist
 Dacia Maraini (born 1936), novelist, playwright, poet, journalist
 Faustina Maratti (c. 1679–1745), poet 
 Andrea Marcolongo (born 1987) Greek classics enthusiast
 Lucrezia Marinella (1571–1653), poet, prose writer
 Battista Malatesta (c. 1384–1448), Renaissance poet
 Chiara Matraini (1515–1604), poet, religious writer
 Margaret Mazzantini (born 1961), actress, novelist
 Melania Mazzucco (born 1966), author
 Diamante Medaglia Faini (1724–1770), poet, madrigal composer
 Alda Merini (1931–2009), revered poet
 Maria Messina (1887–1944), short story writer and novelist
 Beatrice Monroy (born 1953), author and dramatist
 Maria Montessori (1870–1952), educational writer
 Giuliana Morandini (1938–2019), novelist, children's writer
 Elsa Morante (1912–1985), novelist, short story writer, poet
 Marta Morazzoni (born 1950), novelist, short story writer
 Lisa Morpurgo (1923–1998), novelist 
 Isabella Morra (c. 1520–1545), Renaissance poet

N
 Ada Negri (1870–1945), poet, novelist
 Giulia Niccolai (1934–2021), poet, novelist, translator

O
 Anna Maria Ortese (1914–1998), short story writer, poet

P
 Angeliki Palli (1798–1875), Greek-Italian playwright, novelist, poet, translator 
 Melissa Panarello (born 1985), erotic novelist 
 Valeria Parrella (born 1974), novelist, short story writer, playwright
 Nicoletta Pasquale (16th century), poet
 Jeanne Perego (born 1958), children's writer
 Sandra Petrignani (born 1952), journalist, short story writer, novelist
 Giulietta Pezzi (1810–1878), poet, novelist, playwright
 Fernanda Pivano (1917–2009), journalist, biographer, critic, translator
 Christine de Pizan (1364–c. 1430), courtly poet, wrote in French
 Antonia Pozzi (1912–1938), poet, diarist, translator
 Antonia Tanini Pulci (1452/54–1501), early playwright

R
 Fabrizia Ramondino (1936–2008), novelist
 Lidia Ravera (born 1951), journalist, novelist, essayist, screenwriter
 Marina Ripa Di Meana (1941–2018),  autobiographical novelist
 Eugenia Romanelli (born 1972), author, journalist
 Lalla Romano (1906–2001), novelist, poet, journalist

S
 Diodata Saluzzo Roero (1774–1840), poet, novelist
 Sara Santoro Bianchi (1950–2016), archaeologist and classical scholar
 Patrizia Sanvitale (born 1951), journalist, novelist
 Maria Antonia Scalera Stellini (1634–1704), poet, playwright
Michela Schiff Giorgini (1923–1978), Egyptologist, non-fiction writer
 Matilde Serao (1856–1927), Greek-born Italian journalist, novelist
 Clara Sereni (1946–2018), autobiographical literature
 Ippolita Maria Sforza (1446–1484), letter writer, poet
 Gabriella Sica (born 1950), poet
 Maria Luisa Spaziani (1923–2014), poet, translator, academic writer
 Gaspara Stampa (1523–1554),  Renaissance poet
 Sara Copia Sullam (1592–1641), poet

T
 Susanna Tamaro (born 1957), novelist, children's writer 
 Clotilde Tambroni (1758–1817), philologist, poet
 Virginia Tango Piatti (1869–1958), writer and pacifist 
 Laura Terracina (1519–c. 1577), poet
 Maria Tore Barbina (1940–2007), poet, translator 
 Maria Antonietta Torriani (1840–1920), journalist, novelist; pen name "Marchesa Colombi"
 Lucrezia Tornabuoni (1425–1482), poet
 Cristina Trivulzio di Belgiojoso (1808–1871), non-fiction writer, journalist
 Licia Troisi (born 1980), fantasy novelist

V
 Patrizia Valduga (born 1953), poet, translator
 Maria Valtorta (1897–1961), poet, mystic 
 Ida Vassalini (1891–1953), poet, philosopher
 Angela Veronese (1778–1847), poet
 Grazia Verasani (born 1964), crime writer
 Simona Vinci (born 1970), novelist, children's writer
 Patrizia Vicinelli (1943–1991), poet, actress
 Mitì Vigliero Lami (born 1957), journalist, poet, essayist, humorist
 Isabella Vincentini (born 1954), poet, essayist, critic
 Annie Vivanti (1866–1942), novelist, short story writer, playwright

Z
Paola Zancani Montuoro (1901–1987), Italian archaeologist, writer and editor
 Giovanna Zangrandi (1910–1988), novelist
Luisa Zeni (1896–1940), secret agent, writer

See also
 List of Italian writers
 List of women writers
 List of Italian-American women writers

References

External links
 Italian Women Writers database from the University of Chicago

-
Italian women writers, List of
Writers, List of Italian
Women writers, List of Italian
Italian literature-related lists